The Goldbergturm is a 51 metre high water tower on the Goldberg (gold mountain) at  in Sindelfingen, Germany. The Goldbergturm was built in 1963 and has in its basket, besides a water reservoir, a restaurant from which a stairway runs to its open-air observation deck.

External links
 
Skyscraperpage.com entry

Water towers in Germany